Élodie Navarre (born 21 January 1979) is a French actress. Navarre was discovered at 16 when she was spotted on the Paris metro by a casting director and, a year later, appeared in the television film Clara et le Juge. She studied at the Conservatoire d’art dramatique in the 10th arrondissement of Paris and, aged 20, began her professional career as an actor, appearing at the Théâtre de la Criée in Marseille. When she was 22, Navarre suffered multiple fractures after being hit by a car while on holiday in Greece, taking a year to recover. She has since appeared in theatre, film and television.

From 2005 to 2007, Navarre was in a relationship with fellow actor Guillaume Canet.

Selected filmography 
 Crime Scenes (2000)
 Love Me If You Dare (2003)
 Grande École (2004)
 Empire of the Wolves (2005)
 Conversations with My Gardener (2007)
 The Art of Love (2011)
 La Mante (2017) Netflix Original Series

1996 : Love, etc. de Marion Vernoux

1997 : Tangier Cop de Stephen Whittaker : Élise

1999 : Mes amis de Michel Hazanavicius : Isabelle

2000 : Scènes de crimes de Frédéric Schoendoerffer : Marie Bourgoin

2000 : Le Prof d'Alexandre Jardin : Pauline

2001 : Fatou la Malienne de Daniel Vigne : Gaelle

2002 : À la folie... pas du tout de Lætitia Colombani : Anita

2003 : Gomez et Tavarès de Gilles Paquet-Brenner : Paulina

2003 : Jeux d'enfants de Yann Samuell : Aurélie Miller

2004 : Grande école de Robert Salis : Émeline

2005 : Le Souffleur de Guillaume Pixie : Mélanie

2005 : Avant qu'il ne soit trop tard de Laurent Dussaux : Solange

2005 : L'empire des loups de Chris Nahon : la fliquette

2005 : Cavalcade de Steve Suissa : Blandine

2005 : Lettres de la mer Rouge de Emmanuel Caussé et Éric Martin : Armgart

2006 : L'École pour tous d'Éric Rochant : Pivoine

2007 : Dialogue avec mon jardinier de Jean Becker : Carole

2007 : Danse avec lui de Valérie Guignabodet : Lucie

2007 : Jean de la Fontaine, le défi de Daniel Vigne : La Duchesse de Bouillon

2009 : No Pasaran de Emmanuel Caussé et Éric Martin : Scarlett

2009 : Une affaire d'État d'Éric Valette : Katryn

2010 : Les Aventures de Philibert, capitaine puceau de Sylvain Fusée : Inès, comtesse de Bazougues de la Tour en Pendois

2011 : L'Art d'aimer d'Emmanuel Mouret : Vanessa

2013 : Opium d'Arielle Dombasle : la gitane

2016 : Paris Can Wait d'Eleanor Coppola : Carole

'Télévision'

'Séries télévisées'

1998 : Les Marmottes : Lola

1999 : Avocats et Associés : Aurélie Cordère

2000 : Louis Page : Isabelle

2006 : Sable Noir : Julia

2007 : Reporters : Sophie Kosinski

2007 : Le Clan Pasquier : Cécile Pasquier

2013 : Les Petits Meurtres d'Agatha Christie : Elvire

2015-2017 : Le Bureau des légendes : Émilie Duflot

2017 : La Mante : Szofia Kovacs

2018 : Charon de Fréderic Shoendoerffer :Anne Kepler

Téléfilms

1997 : Clara et son Juge : Clara

1997 : Le Garçon d'orage : Jeanne

1999 : L'Occasionnelle : Mélanie

1999 : La route à l'envers : Lucia

2001 : Fatou la Malienne : Gaëlle

2001 : L'Apprentissage de la ville : Lucrèce

2003 : Un amour en kit : Delphine

2003 : Fruits mûrs : Sandrine Ricœur

2004 : L'Insaisissable : Maxime Kovacs, la fille

2004 : Pierre et Jean : Tanya Doubrovski

2005 : Les Femmes d'abord : Éva

2006 : Poussière d'amour : Caroline

2006 : Lettres de la mer rouge : Armgart

2008 : Drôle de Noël : Valérie

2009 : L'École du pouvoir : Caroline Séguier

2010 : Les Châtaigniers du désert : Marie

2013 : Shanghai blues, nouveau monde : Marine

2017 : Mystère Place Vendôme de Renaud Bertrand : Albertine d'Alencourt

2018 : Meurtres en Cornouaille de Franck Mancuso : Katell Morvan

Théâtre

2000 : Les Fausses Confidences de Marivaux mise en scène Gildas Bourdet

2000 : On ne badine pas avec l'amour d'Alfred de Musset, mise en scène Jean-Louis Bihoreau

2005 : L'Autre de Florian Zeller, mise en scène Annick Blancheteau, théâtre des Petits Mathurins

2007 : Médée de Jean Anouilh, mise en scène Ladislas Chollat

2007 : En toute confiance de Donald Margulies, mise en scène Michel Fagadau

2009 : Médée de Jean Anouilh, mise en scène Ladislas Chollat

2010 : Une comédie romantique de Gérald Sibleyras, mise en scène Christophe Lidon, théâtre Montparnasse

2010 : Chien-Chien de Fabrice Roger-Lacan, mise en scène Jérémie Lippmann, théâtre de l'Atelier

2011 : Sunderland de Clement Koch, mise en scène Stéphane Hillel, théâtre de Paris

2013 : Sunderland de Clement Koch, mise en scène Stéphane Hillel, tournée en province et à l'étranger

2014 : Le Misanthrope de Molière, mise en scène Michèle André, Festival d'Avignon, théâtre Actuel

2015 : Les Cartes du pouvoir de Beau Willimon, mise en scène Ladislas Chollat, théâtre Hébertot

2016 : Encore une histoire d'amour de Tom Kempinski, mise en scène de Ladislas Chollat, théâtre des Champs-Élysées

2018 : Le Fils de Florian Zeller, mise en scène Ladislas Chollat, théâtre des Champs-Élysées

Clips

1997 : On ira de Jean-Jacques Goldman, réalisé par Gérard Namiand
2014 : Tears of Joy de Prince of Assyria, réalisé par Lidwine HerduinDistinctions'''

2010 : Prix Suzanne-Bianchetti, récompense française de la Société des auteurs et compositeurs dramatiques qui est décernée chaque année depuis 1937 à la jeune actrice la plus prometteuse.
2013 : Chistera du public pour son court-métrage Ce sera tout pour aujourd'hui au Festival international des jeunes réalisateurs de Saint-Jean-de-Luz.
2018 : Nomination au Molière de la comédienne dans un second rôle pour la pièce Le Fils de Florian Zeller, dans une mise en scène de Ladislas Chollat.

References

External links

 Elodie Navarre Official Website

Living people
1979 births
French film actresses
French stage actresses
French television actresses